Vítor Hugo Simão do Vale Rocha, ComIH (born 13 April 1972) is a Portuguese competitive sailor and Olympic medalist. He won a bronze medal in the 470 class at the 1996 Summer Olympics in Atlanta, along with his partner Nuno Barreto.

At the 1996 470-European-Sailing-Championship he won with his Partner Nuno Barreto the silver medal.

He won the J/80 world championship in 2013 and the SB20 world championship in 2016.

References

External links
 

 

1972 births
Living people
Sportspeople from Oslo
Olympic bronze medalists for Portugal
Olympic medalists in sailing
Olympic sailors of Portugal
Portuguese male sailors (sport)
Sailors at the 1992 Summer Olympics – 470
Sailors at the 1996 Summer Olympics – 470
Sailors at the 2000 Summer Olympics – Tornado
Snipe class sailors
Medalists at the 1996 Summer Olympics
SB20 class world champions
World champions in sailing for Portugal